Mohali is a village situated in SAS Nagar district. Mohali city got its name from this village. It is located in Sector 56 of the city.

Language
Punjabi and Hindi are main spoken languages in Mohali.

Administration
The village is managed by Gram Panchayat.

Gurudwaras and temples
 Gurudwara Gobindsar Sahib

References

Mohali
Villages in Sahibzada Ajit Singh Nagar district